Sergei Aleksandrovich Bendz (born 3 April 1983) is a Russian former footballer.

Club career
He made his Russian Premier League debut for FC Rostov on 5 October 2003 in a game against FC Uralan Elista.

References

External links
 Player page on the official FC Terek Grozny website 
 

1983 births
Sportspeople from Krasnodar
Living people
Russian footballers
Russia under-21 international footballers
Russia national football B team footballers
Association football defenders
FC Rostov players
FC Akhmat Grozny players
Russian Premier League players
FC Volga Nizhny Novgorod players
FC Kuban Krasnodar players
FC Nizhny Novgorod (2007) players
FC Tom Tomsk players
FC Luch Vladivostok players
FC Urozhay Krasnodar players
FC SKA Rostov-on-Don players